Osborne Harbour, Nova Scotia  is a community in the Shelburne County, Nova Scotia, Canada. It may have been named for Osborne House, a royal residence used by Queen Victoria on the Isle of Wight. The community was originally settled by Loyalists in 1788.

References

General Service Areas in Nova Scotia
Communities in Shelburne County, Nova Scotia